Traverser is a progressive rock band formed in 2004. The band is known for their use of visual art, and conceptually oriented songs and lyrics. Their live performances often include samples of pre-recorded audio to imply a storyline or theme to the audience. The band wrote and performed as a trio until October 2009 when Jon Shaffer, former guitarist for 7 Blue Skies, joined the band as a permanent second guitarist. Traverser has appeared at several major venues and events in central Florida including the 2009 Florida Music Festival The band began touring in 2011 in support of the re-release of their self-titled debut.

Members

Current Members
 David Medairos - Lead Vocals/Guitar
 David (DC) Shaw - Drums
 Jon Shaffer - Guitar/Vocals
 Rick Garitta - Bass/Vocals

Former Members
 Robert Spence - Bass (2004 - 2014)

Sponsorships
Traverser is sponsored by Gibson Guitars, Fryette Amplification and Inearz Audio

Discography

Albums
Traverser - 2009 Independent Release
Telemetry - 2010
Redshift - 2012 Independent Release
Jupiter Doesn't Care About You - 2019 Independent Release

DVDs
Traversing The Blue Skies - 2009 Independent Release

Singles

References

Musical groups established in 2004
Musical groups from Orlando, Florida
American progressive rock groups